Jérôme Nalliod (born 29 July 1966) is a French diver. He competed in the men's 3 metre springboard event at the 1988 Summer Olympics.

References

External links
 

1966 births
Living people
French male divers
Olympic divers of France
Divers at the 1988 Summer Olympics
Place of birth missing (living people)